Rafiddias Akhdan Nugroho (born 23 January 1996) is an Indonesian male badminton player. In 2015, he became a champion at the Indonesian National Badminton Championships in mixed doubles event partnered with Vita Marissa.

References

External links 
 

Living people
1996 births
Indonesian male badminton players
Sportspeople from Jakarta
21st-century Indonesian people